Yael Moses is a professor in the Efi Arazi School of Computer Science at the Interdisciplinary Center Herzliya, Israel.

Education and career 
Moses received her Ph.D. in computer science at the Weizmann Institute of Science, Rehovot. She was a post-doctoral fellow in the Robotics group at the University of Oxford from 1993 to 1994 and at the Weizmann Institute of Science from 1994 to 1997. Moses has been on the editorial board of the IEEE Transactions on Pattern Analysis and Machine Intelligence since 2013.

Research 
Her major research interests are in computer vision. In particular, her research focusses on multi-camera systems.

References

External links
Yael Moses' IEEE profile

Computer vision researchers
Israeli women academics
Weizmann Institute of Science alumni
Academic staff of Reichman University
Year of birth missing (living people)
Living people